James Wood High School is located at the northern tip of the Shenandoah Valley in Winchester, Virginia and is a part of the Frederick County Public School system. It is located at 161 Apple Pie Ridge Road.

James Wood High School was established in 1950 on Amherst Street as the high school for Frederick County, Virginia. It combined the students of five other high schools in the county: Gainesboro, Gore, Stonewall, Stephens City, and Middletown.

James Wood High School owes its name to a famous Revolutionary War colonel, James Wood, who was also governor of Virginia from 1796 to 1799. As Frederick County grew, the need for a larger school became evident. In 1981, the "Ridge Campus", on Apple Pie Ridge Road, was opened. Between 1981 and 1993, James Wood High School operated two campuses serving 9th and 10th grade students at the "Amherst Campus" and 11th and 12th grade students at the "Ridge Campus", offering busing for students between the two campuses for some classes (band, choir, upper level science classes, etc.). After the opening of Sherando High School in 1993, all grades of James Wood High School were consolidated to the Ridge Campus and the Amherst Campus became James Wood Middle School.

Today, James Wood High School offers a wide range of programs formulated on the concept of teaching the total individual. Academics, athletics and activities play integral parts in the development of skills and knowledge. The current principal is Sam Gross. There are also three assistant principals who divide the student authority between them.

Athletics 
James Wood plays in the AAAA Norhwestern District. Its mascot is the Colonel, and the school colors are blue and gold. Since the opening of the school in 1955, the Colonels have earned four state championships; boys' cross country (1968), football (1970), boys' cross country (2002), and girls' doubles tennis (2008), as well as numerous state runner-up titles and regional championships in various sports.

Academic opportunities 
Lord Fairfax Community College offers dual enrollment where students take an AP class and gain college credit that can be transferred to many in state and some out of state universities.

References

External links 
James Wood High School homepage
Frederick County Public Schools

Educational institutions established in 1950
Public high schools in Virginia
Schools in Frederick County, Virginia
1950 establishments in Virginia